Gorai is a village in Iglas Tehsil of Aligarh district in the Indian state of Uttar Pradesh.

References 

Cities and towns in Aligarh district
Villages in Aligarh district